The 2017 San Luis Open Challenger Tour will be a professional tennis tournament played on hard courts. It will be the 24th edition of the tournament which will be part of the 2017 ATP Challenger Tour. It will take place in San Luis Potosí, Mexico between 10 and 16 March 2017.

Point distribution

Singles main-draw entrants

Seeds

 1 Rankings are as of April 3, 2017.

Other entrants
The following players received wildcards into the singles main draw:
  Facundo Bagnis
  Tigre Hank
  Miomir Kecmanović
  Manuel Sánchez

The following players received entry from the qualifying draw:
  Facundo Argüello
  Roberto Cid Subervi
  Carlos de la Peña
  Marcel Felder

The following player received entry as a lucky loser:
  Luca Margaroli

Champions

Singles

 Andrej Martin def.  Adrián Menéndez Maceiras 7–5, 6–4.

Doubles

 Roberto Quiroz /  Caio Zampieri def.  Hans Hach Verdugo /  Adrián Menéndez Maceiras 6–4, 6–2.

External links
Official Website

San Luis Open Challenger Tour
San Luis Potosí Challenger